Chew Disco was a queer feminist art and cultural activism project founded in Liverpool, England in 2009 by Emma Obong and Khalil West. Primarily a series of club nights and house parties, the project was known for its queer DIY ethos and aesthetic, the stylistic diversity of its performers and programmes, and the political advocacy and fundraising components of its live events. Owing to the sexual fluidity and playfulness of its atmosphere, large-scale video art projections, and emphasis on dancing, its live events and weekend parties garnered comparisons to The Factory and DUMBA.

History

West and Obong met shortly after's West's relocation from New Jersey to Liverpool in 2006. In early 2009, the duo conceived Chew Disco as an alternative to both the city's gay quarter and its DIY and punk music scenes, directing their explicit focus to political partying, racial inclusivity, sexual fluidity, and musical diversity.

The club night was launched on 7 August 2009. From 2009 to 2016, the live event hosted performances by more than 40 bands, musicians, DJs, and multidisciplinary artists, including Vaginal Davis, Trash Kit, Mykki Blanco, Cakes da Killa, Shopping, Joey Fourr, MR TC, Queer’d Science, and Optimo Music acts Golden Teacher and Shift Work. Funds raised through many of the events were donated to various LGBTQ+ and women's and girl's rights organisations, including Iraqi LGBT, the Iranian and Kurdish Women's Rights Organization (IKWRO), Icebreakers Uganda (part of Sexual Minorities Uganda), International Railroad for Queer Refugees, Panzi Hospital, and Coming Out (Russia).
By 2011, the project had begun to collaborate as stage and film curators with more formal arts institutions, collectives and festivals, including Islington Mill, Foundation for Art and Creative Technology (FACT), Cheryl, Homotopia, Abandon Normal Devices, and Sounds From The Other City.

The party has been described as the “best alternative night in town” and was heavily influenced by Obong's Black feminist politics, West's formative years in the queer and punk club spaces of New Jersey and New York City's East Village, and their shared interests in hip hop, queercore, house, and post-punk music, scenes and movements. The project's general design aesthetic drew equally heavily on American b-movies, underground or “cult” cinema, and vintage pulp paperbacks, and elements of its flagship events included free mix tapes, go-go dance performances (often incorporating fake blood and found objects), and “secret” afterparties.

Events and Programmes

2009
Chew Disco Vol. 1: Husbands, Ste McCabe, Vile Vile Creatures, at The Magnet, 9 Aug 2009
Chew Disco Vol. 2: Peepholes, Ste McCabe, Vile Vile Creatures, Trash Kit, at The Masque, 14 Nov 2009

2010
Chew Disco Vol. 3: Pifco, Peepholes, Seawitches, at Korova Bar, 19 Mar 2010
Chew Disco Vol. 4: The Arch Nazards, Dirtblonde, at Korova Bar, 16 Apr 2010
Chew Disco Vol. 5: Death of the Elephant, Lovecraft, El Toro!, at The Shipping Forecast, 11 Jun 2010
Chew Disco Vol. 6: Will and Rick, Beards, My Elastic Eye, Millie Dollar, at Puzzle Bar, 7 Aug 2010
Chew Disco Vol. 7: Pifco, Matron, We Came Out Like Tigers, Trevy Trevwa, Sister Mantos, Covergirl, at The Shipping Forecast and The Pilgrim, 10-11 Sep 2010
Chew Disco Vol. 8: Maria & The Gay, Barbieshop, Organ Freeman, Apple Cannon, at The Shipping Forecast, 29 Oct 2010

2011
Chew Disco Vol. 9: Punk Bunny, Black Barbie, Penelope Edmund, at The Shipping Forecast, 29 Jan 2011
Chew Disco Vol. 10: Georgia Asphalt, Dirtblonde, Covergirl, at The Kazimier, 7 May 2011
Chew Disco and Queerfest present: Bent Frames, a series of film screenings at FACT, May – Jun 2011 
Mala Noche (dir. Gus Van Sant, 1986)
The Watermelon Woman (dir. Cheryl Dunye, 1996)
Hustler White (dir. Rick Castro, Bruce La Bruce, 1996)
By Hook or By Crook (dir. Harry Dodge, Silas Howard, 2001)
Chew Disco & Abandon Normal Devices present: Bruce La Bruce’s L.A. Zombie, with Severin, Bad Taste Barbies, at Wolstenholme Creative Space, 30 Sep 2011

2012
Chew Disco presents: Georgia Asphalt, Cuss Words, at Royal Rukus (Cheryl/Off With Their Heads), Islington Mill, 3 Jun 2012

2013
Chew Disco Vol. 11: Sex Hands, Queer’d Science, Trash Kit, at The Kazimier, 2 Feb 2013
Chew Disco, Off With Their Heads & Murkage present: Mykki Blanco, at Islington Mill, 16 May 2013
Chew Disco Vol. 12: Vaginal Davis, Shopping, ILL, at The Kazimier, and John Waters afterparty at Homotopia, 8 Nov 2013

2014
CHERYL7: Cheryl (artist collective), Chew Disco, Guts For Garters, Pumping Iron, DJ Nick, at Islington Mill, 28 Jun 2014
Chew Disco & Comfortable On A Tightrope present: Juffage, Picastro, Islaja, Yong Yong, Shopping, Golden Teacher, at Sounds From The Other City, 4 May 2014
Chew Disco presents: Los Cripis, with Dog Legs, Good Grief, Dream Soda, at The Shipping Forecast, 10 Jul 2014

2015
Chew Disco Vol. 13: Apostille, Happy Meals, Shift Work, at The Kazimier, 28 Mar 2015
Chew Disco presents: Game_Program, Galaxians, Golden Teacher, at The Kazimier, 21 May 2015
Chew Disco presents: Apostille, Cakes da Killa, at Soup Kitchen, 16 Jul 2015
Chew Disco film series for Homotopia, Nov 2015
Portrait of Jason (dir. Shirley Clarke, 1967)
Pay It No Mind: The Life and Times of Marsha P. Johnson (dir. Michael Kasino, 2012)
Out in the Night (dir. Blair Dorosh-Walther, 2014)
The Queen (dir. Frank Simon, 1968)

2016
Chew Disco & Trash-O-Rama present: The Birth Marks, Mother, Joey Fourr, Queer’d Science, Happy Meals, Mr TC, at Sounds From The Other City, 1 May 2016

Hiatus

Following the relocation of Obong to Berlin in 2015, the project entered hiatus. Between 2015 and 2019, the two, noted for their “amazing chemistry”, continued to DJ both as a duo and independently in the UK and Berlin.

In 2015, West began an Arts Council funded multimedia collaboration with British artist Ajamu X. The project, I Am For You Can Enjoy, combines West's video oral history interviews with Ajamu's portraits to explore the lived experiences of queer, Black, male and masculine-identified sex workers.

References 

2009 establishments in England
2016 disestablishments in England
Recurring events established in 2009
Recurring events disestablished in 2016
Queer culture